"Song from the Edge of the World" is a song written and performed by English rock band Siouxsie and the Banshees. It was released as a stand-alone single in 1987. The song had been premiered live in the UK during an appearance at the WOMAD Festival in July 1986. The song was recorded with new members Martin McCarrick on keyboards and Jon Klein on guitar.

Music and background
The track is an uptempo number with strong percussion performed by drummer Budgie. The song had already been demoed during the Tinderbox-era with guitarist John Valentine Carruthers but not released at the time. The single version was recorded in late May and early June 1987 with two new members, guitarist Jon Klein and keyboardist Martin McCarrick.

The single had not appeared on any album and was not included on any greatest hits collections until 2002's The Best of Siouxsie and the Banshees, albeit only on the bonus disc of the limited edition of the album, and in its 12-inch "Columbus Mix" version. The original 7" version made its CD debut as a bonus track on the 2014 reissue of Through The Looking Glass.

Siouxsie Sioux later explained that she wasn't satisfied with the work of producer Mike Thorne during the recording sessions, which was one of the main reasons the band decided not to include this one-off single on their 1992 Twice Upon a Time - The Singles compilation. The early studio version performed with Carruthers was included on the remastered CD version of Tinderbox.

"Song from the Edge of the World" peaked at No. 59 in the UK Singles Chart.

References 

1987 singles
Siouxsie and the Banshees songs
Songs written by Siouxsie Sioux
Songs written by Budgie (musician)
Songs written by Steven Severin